Magdalen Tower, completed in 1509, is a bell tower that forms part of Magdalen College, Oxford. It is a central focus for the celebrations in Oxford on May Morning.

History
Magdalen Tower is one of the oldest parts of Magdalen College, Oxford, situated directly in the High Street. Built of stone from 1492, when the foundation stone was laid, its bells hung ready for use in 1505, and completed by 1509, it is an important element of the Oxford skyline. It dominates the eastern entrance to the city, towering over Magdalen Bridge and with good views from the Botanic Garden opposite.

The tower, joined to the south range of college buildings, is built in four storeys unequal in height. Octagonal turrets encase the corners; the slightly larger northwest turret encloses the spiral stair, lit by slit windows. The basement is windowless; the second and third stages have small windows in three sides; the fourth, principal storey is loftier, with a double window on each face divided by a buttress rising through the panelled frieze and mock battlements, where it is surmounted by a figure in a niche crowned by a pinnacle slightly smaller than the four pinnacles that crown the corners.

The tower contains a peal of ten bells hung for English change ringing. They were cast at a number of different foundries and the heaviest, weighing 17 cwt, was cast in 1623. The bells are rung on many occasions during the year by the Oxford Society of Change Ringers at the invitation of the college. Such occasions include significant royal and college anniversaries, and after some services in the College Chapel. The bells received their last major overhaul in 2012, being returned to the tower in March of that year.

Members of Magdalen are able to procure the 10" iron key to the door at its base from the porter's lodge.

May Morning

Every 1 May, at 6am, the choir of the college (including boy choristers from nearby Magdalen College School) sings two traditional hymns – the Hymnus Eucharisticus and "Now Is the Month of Maying" – to start the May Morning celebrations in Oxford. Large crowds gather in the High Street and on Magdalen Bridge below to listen, before dispersing for other activities such as Morris Dancing.

Extensive restoration to the stone facing of the tower was undertaken in the 1970s since pollution had badly degraded the surface.

See also 
 Founders Tower, Magdalen College
 Tom Tower at Christ Church, Oxford

Notes

References 
 Jennifer Sherwood and Nikolaus Pevsner, The Buildings of England: Oxfordshire. .

External links 

 Magdalen Tower and the Hymnus Eucharisticus
 Oxford's May Morning from the BBC, 2003

Infrastructure completed in 1509
Towers completed in the 16th century
Tower
Towers in Oxford
Bell towers in the United Kingdom
Tourist attractions in Oxford
Buildings and structures of the University of Oxford